Delias hidecoae  is a species of pierine butterfly  endemic to Mindoro in the Philippines. The type locality is Mount Halcon, Mindoro.

The wingspan is 70–80 mm.

References

hidecoae
Butterflies described in 1993